Stephen of Moldavia may refer to:

 Stephen I of Moldavia (1394–1399)
 Stephen II of Moldavia (1434–1435, 1436–1447)
 Stephen III of Moldavia (1457–1504), also known as Stephen the Great (Ştefan Cel Mare)
 Stephen IV of Moldavia (1517–1527)
 Stephen Locust (1538–1540)
 Ştefan VI Rareş (1551–1552)
 Ştefan Tomşa (1563–1564)